Central Prison, Kannur, is situated in Pallikkunnu in Kannur, Kerala state of India. It was the first Central Jail established in Kerala in the year of 1869. It is authorised to accommodate 1062 prisoners. It is one of the four central prisons other than Thiruvananthapuram,  Thrissur and Malapuram situated in Kerala.

History 
The Cannanore district has always had an important place in the administrative set up of the Prisons Department. In the early part of the 19th century, Tellicherry and Cannanore towns had their own jails and work was found for the convicts on the roads. In middle of the century the mortality rate among the prisoners in these jails was high as a result of the outbreak of epidemics like Cholera and Smallpox. The jail at Tellicherry was abolished in 1885. The Central Jail at Cannanore which is at present one of the three Central jails of Kerala State was built in 1869 on the association block system with accommodation for 1062  prisoners. This was the only  Central jail in the erstwhile Malabar District, and it also received long term convicts from the neighbouring district of South Canara. Owing to the need for increased accommodation, the Jail was considerably enlarged and in the early thirties it could provide accommodation for as many as 1684 prisoners.
The Cannanore Central Jail is located on the right side of the Cannanore Baliapatam Road at Pallikunnu and is 22/1 miles away from the Cannanore Railway Station on the north easterly direction. The Jail area comprises 124.45 acres inclusive of 35 acres within the four walls of the main Jail.

There is accommodation for 1580 prisoners in the Jail. In addition to prisoners convicted by Criminal Courts, under-trail prisoners remanded to custody by Courts in Cannanore District and civil debtors sent to this jail from the Civil Courts are also detained in this Jail. This Jail has now been classified as a Jail for casual offenders convicted and  sentenced  to imprisonment by the Criminal Courts in Trichur, Palghat, Cannanore and Kozhikode Districts. The Cannanore Central Jail, is under the administrative control of the Inspector General of Prisons, Kerala State.

References

Prisons in Kerala
1869 establishments in India